State Route 30 (SR 30), also known as the Tres Rios Freeway, is a planned freeway in the southwest part of the Phoenix metropolitan area. It is planned as a reliever for Interstate 10 five miles to the south and will run through the communities of Buckeye, Goodyear, Avondale, and Phoenix.

In earlier planning stages, the freeway was formerly labeled State Route 801 (SR 801).

SR 30 will be broken into three segments: The western segment from SR 85 to Loop 303, the central segment from Loop 303 to Loop 202, and the eastern segment from Loop 202 to I-17.

Route description
SR 30 is planned to begin at SR 85 along the Hazen Road alignment, about one mile south of downtown Buckeye. It will then travel northeast for 10 miles before intersecting Loop 303 between Broadway Road and Southern Avenue in Goodyear. SR 30 will then head east for five miles before turning southeast at the Agua Fria River and running along the Southern Avenue alignment for two and a half miles. While along the Southern Avenue alignment, frontage roads will accompany the road to provide access to local communities. SR 30 will then head back northeast for seven miles before intersecting Loop 202 just south of Broadway Road in Phoenix. SR 30 will then continue to travel northeast for four and a half miles before meeting its eastern terminus by intersecting the Interstate 17 at the Durango Curve in Phoenix. SR 30 will be  in length when fully complete.

History
In November 2004, Maricopa County voters approved an extension to an existing sales tax funding regional transportation improvements. A significant portion of those funds will go toward improvements of Interstate 10, which experiences significant volumes of traffic in the southwest part of the Valley. However, rapid growth in the neighboring communities of Buckeye, Goodyear, and Avondale is expected to worsen the congestion on I-10, necessitating the construction of a reliever route.

The Arizona Department of Transportation first identified the need for a route along the current SR 30 corridor in June 2005. The route was planned to run parallel to I-10 five miles to the south through the cities to provide relief. It would run through largely undeveloped land, reducing the impact on residential communities. Due to the extension of the sales tax in 2004, funds were available to help build SR 30. 

In response to a budget shortfall brought on by the Great Recession, the Maricopa Association of Governments (MAG) voted to suspend funding to numerous projects in October 2009, including SR 30. While not removing SR 30 from the long-term regional transportation plan, the removal of the funding would effectively postpone the construction of the route until at least 2026. The plan had originally indicated a construction timeline between 2021 and 2025.

In October 2016, it was announced that ADOT was exploring the possibility of building SR 30 as a toll road to accelerate its construction. It was met with mixed reviews from the public and ultimately not approved. The toll feasibility study took six months.
 
On October 26, 2017, local mayors officially named SR 30 the Tres Rios Freeway after the nearby Gila, Agua Fria, and Salt rivers.

In May 2019, the central segment alternative was approved. It was chosen carefully after four years of study comparing four different possible alternatives.

Current Status
Funding for SR 30 is reliant on an extension of a regional transportation sales tax that currently ends in 2025. In March 2022, the Arizona Senate passed a bill to put that sales tax extension up for voting in spring 2023, however Governor Doug Ducey vetoed that bill in July 2022. Because of this, the tax extension will have to be placed on a future ballot. If the tax extension is approved, funding would be provided for all three segments. If the tax extension is not approved, that could put the construction of SR 30 in jeopardy.

ADOT is currently in the process of acquiring right-of-way for the central segment. In their five-year plan released in March 2022, ADOT has budgeted funds for this purchase.

Construction of the central segment will not be until at least 2026. There is no timeline for the western and eastern segments yet.

When SR 30 is first constructed, there will be three lanes in each direction. The ultimate configuration allows for four lanes and one high-occupancy vehicle lane (HOV) in each direction.

Exit list
Exit numbers have not yet been assigned. This exit list is based on preliminary studies and may not be the final design plan. Mileposts are determined from the western terminus of the SR 30 project.

See also
 Roads and freeways in metropolitan Phoenix
 Arizona State Route 24
Arizona State Route 202
Arizona State Route 303

References

External links

 Arizona Department of Transportation page

030
030
Proposed state highways in the United States
Transportation in Maricopa County, Arizona